The Lao Brewery Company Ltd. (LBC) (ບໍລິສັດ ເບຍລາວ ຈໍາກັດ Bolisad Beerlao Chamkad) is a producer of beer, soft drinks, and bottled drinking water in Laos. It is headquartered in Vientiane.

History
Founded in 1971, the Lao Brewery Company was at that time a joint-venture between French and Lao businessmen. It took up production in 1973 with a capacity of 3 million litres per year. The company, then called Brasseries et Glacières du Laos (BGL), marketed Bière Larue for the local market and "33" export for export (to countries in Indochina).

With the establishment of the Democratic People's Republic of Laos in 1975, the company was nationalised and obtained the status of a state-owned enterprise. It marketed its beer first under the Bière Lao brand, then (early 1995) as Beerlao. Their brand "33" export was marketed till 1990, and Bière Larue until 1995.

In the wake of the 1986 economic reform program, which initiated a transition from central planning to a market economy and the launching of the New Economic Mechanism (NEM), the LBC in 1993 entered into a joint venture: 49% Lao government-owned with 51% foreign investment (Loxley: 25.5% and Italian: 25.5%) with a production capacity of 20 million litres per year and employing 300 workers.

In 2005 there was a change in ownership, when Carlsberg Group acquired 50% of the company, while the Lao government kept 50%. 

In 2007 Carlsberg Group acquired 70% of the shares in Lao Soft Drink Co Ltd., with the Lao government keeping the remaining shares. 

All machinery is imported from Europe. The company processes locally grown rice and imports malted barley from France and Belgium, and hops and yeast from Germany.

Products

The company produces and markets 5 types of beer under the Beerlao brand (Beerlao Lager, Beerlao Gold, Beerlao Dark, Beerlao White, and Beerlao IPA) in addition to Lanexang lager. It also produces and markets bottled drinking water under the Tigerhead brand.

LBC claims it has a 99% local beer market share.  Beerlao is exported to a dozen countries, but the export figures are still modest, though increasing.

Some Beerlao products (like Tigerhead water) are presented as they have been awarded several times with Gold Quality Awards at the World Quality Selections, organised yearly by Monde Selection but there is no mention of it on the official website
.

External links 
Official site

References

Food and drink companies established in 1971
Beer in Laos
Companies of Laos
PepsiCo bottlers
Economy of Vientiane